Epigonus telescopus, the black cardinal fish, is a species of deepwater cardinalfish found in most temperate oceans worldwide, at depths of between  though mostly between . It can reach a length of  TL though most specimens do not exceed  TL.  It has been reported that this species can reach an age of 104 years.

Description
The black cardinal fish is a shallow-bodied fish with large eyes and a blunt snout and slightly projecting lower jaw. The dorsal fin is in two parts and has seven or eight spines and nine to eleven soft rays. The anal fin has two spines and nine soft rays. The general colour of this fish is purplish-brown or black and living specimens are iridescent.

Distribution and habitat
The black cardinal fish is a deepwater bentho-pelagic fish that is found on continental slopes, undersea ridges and seamounts in the northern Atlantic, ranging from Iceland to the Canary Islands and the Corner Rise Seamounts. It is also found in the southeastern Atlantic, including the Walvis Ridge off southwestern Africa, the Indian Ocean and the southwestern Pacific Ocean.

Fisheries
The black cardinal fish is subject to commercial fisheries, primarily around seamounts. Based on the FAO fishery statistics, the annual catches worldwide ranged between 1,355 and 4,353 tonnes in 2000 to 2009, most of the fish being taken from the Southwest Pacific (FAO Fishing Area 81).  However, according to Watson et al., the catches peaked at 10,000 tonnes in the year 2000.

References
 Tony Ayling & Geoffrey Cox, Collins Guide to the Sea Fishes of New Zealand,  (William Collins Publishers Ltd, Auckland, New Zealand 1982) 

Epigonidae
Fish described in 1810
Taxa named by Antoine Risso
Fish of the Atlantic Ocean
Fish of the Indian Ocean
Fish of the Pacific Ocean